Planorbis planorbis is a species of air-breathing freshwater snail, an aquatic gastropod mollusk in the family Planorbidae, the ram's horn snails.

Distribution
 Cosmopolitan - introduced and being considered invasive to many places and considered as a pest
 Czech Republic - least concern (LC)
 Slovakia
 Germany - not listed in red list
 the Netherlands
 Poland
 Great Britain
 Ireland
 Hungary

Description

This species, like all planorbids, has a sinistral shell. The width of the shell is 15 – 20 mm. The keel on the periphery of the shell is near the edge closest to the spire side, which is carried downwards in life.

Ecology 
The habitat of this species is shallow standing and slowly running freshwaters on a mud substrate, also ponds and temporarily drying flood waters, up to 1 metre depth. Planorbis planorbis does not tolerate intensive water movements but is  tolerant to eutrophic conditions.

References

External links

Planorbis planorbis at Animalbase

Planorbidae
Gastropods described in 1758
Taxa named by Carl Linnaeus